Thai is a Unicode block containing characters for the Thai, Lanna Tai, and Pali languages. It is based on the Thai Industrial Standard 620-2533.

Block

History
The following Unicode-related documents record the purpose and process of defining specific characters in the Thai block:

References 

Unicode blocks
Encodings of Thai